Hussain Niyaz Mohamed (born 19 March 1987), nicknamed Bokury, is a Maldivian professional footballer who plays as a winger for Club Valencia and Maldives national team.

International goals

Scores and results list the Maldives goal tally first.

References

External links 

Hussain Niyaz stats 1 at maldivesoccer.com
Hussain Niyaz stats 1 at maldivesoccer.com

1987 births
Living people
Maldivian footballers
Maldives international footballers
New Radiant S.C. players
Victory Sports Club players
Association football wingers
Footballers at the 2010 Asian Games
Asian Games competitors for the Maldives